William Henry Dakin (August 8, 1816August 20, 1892) was an American farmer, politician, and Wisconsin pioneer.  He served in the Wisconsin State Assembly, representing Green Lake County during the 1875 session.  He was the first settler in the town of Brooklyn, Green Lake County, Wisconsin.

Biography
William H. Dakin was born in Dutchess County, New York, in August 1816.  He attended public and private schools and finished his education at the Poughkeepsie Academy.  When he was 17 years old, he went to live with his brother-in-law, and then sailed to South America, visiting several countries.  He returned to New York and resided there until 1843, when he left for the Wisconsin Territory.

He purchased land in the area that would become Green Lake County, at the time it was still part of Marquette County.  After making some additional travel to gather livestock and provisions, he set to work clearing and sowing his farm.  Over the subsequent years, he purchased a great deal of additional land in Green Lake County, some of which he dealt off in parcels to new settlers, but Dakin retained over 3000 acres for his own use for a number of years.

He served as a member of the county commission (predecessor to the county board of supervisors) and was treasurer of Marquette County before Green Lake County was created.  He also served as chairman of the town board of Brooklyn for several years.  During his term as town chairman, the town was involved in a protracted legal dispute with the Sheboygan and Fond du Lac Railroad.  Through Dakin's work on the settlement, the county saved about $13,000.

He was originally a supporter of the Democratic Party, but became a Republican after the American Civil War.  He was elected on the Republican ticket to the Wisconsin State Assembly in 1874, and served in the 1875 session.  He was not a candidate for re-election in 1875.

Electoral history

Wisconsin Assembly (1874)

| colspan="6" style="text-align:center;background-color: #e9e9e9;"| General Election, November 3, 1874

References

External links
 

1816 births
1892 deaths
People from Poughkeepsie, New York
People from Green Lake County, Wisconsin
Farmers from Wisconsin
Republican Party members of the Wisconsin State Assembly
19th-century American politicians